Hurley is a village and rural civil parish in Berkshire, England. Its riverside is agricultural, except for Hurley Priory, as are the outskirts of the village. The Olde Bell Inn adjoining the priory is believed to date from 1135.

Topography
Hurley is a linear development perpendicular to and adjoining the Upper Thames  NW of Maidenhead and  ENE of Henley-on-Thames, Oxfordshire on the A4130. The parish includes the hamlets of Cockpole Green, Warren Row, Knowl Hill, Burchett's Green and part of Littlewick Green. Other than this, the parish is mainly agricultural; however, many farms have spinneys of woodland adjoining.

Historic structures
 By the river is Hurley Priory, a partially moated Benedictine priory founded in 1086 as a cell of Westminster Abbey. The priory was dissolved in 1536, but its priory church survives as the current parish church and is a Scheduled Monument.  
 'The Olde Bell' Inn is reputedly the oldest still-working inn in Britain; parts of the inn date to 1135, when it was the hostelry of the priory. 
 The old manor estate of Hall Place (1728) is now the home of Berkshire College of Agriculture. 
The Manor House in the High Street was used as Station Victor, forming part of Operation Sussex, the running of agents in occupied Europe by the American OSS.
 The former main priory building became a mansion known as Ladye Place, which stood adjoining the present parish church. It was the home of the Barons Lovelace. It was demolished in 1837 as uninhabitable.
 The Grassland Research Institute (GRI) also had a facility at Hurley until 1992.

Localities

Hurley Bottom
Only one of the buildings at the foot of the hill in the south of the village street is listed.  This southerly neighbourhood has the local name of Hurley Bottom but is  higher than the riverside parts of the village.

Frogmill Court and Frogmill Spinney
The early 19 century Frogmill Court is now a farmhouse  adjoining the river, which in this parish consists of mainly grazing and pasture meadows. The farmhouse is Grade II listed  Frogmill Spinney forms a riverside park housing estate. Another group of riverside homes are accessed by a separate lane.

Recreation
Hurley is often used as a mooring for leisure craft and by campers. Cricket has been played in Hurley for over 100 years. The club currently plays in the Chiltern League on Saturdays and friendly fixtures against local rivals on Sundays. The  ground has a London plane tree inside the boundary. The clubhouse was rebuilt in the 1970s after fire destroyed the previous wooden one. The Temple Golf Club was founded in 1909. It is recognised for its scenic beauty and its emphasis on sustainable environmental management.

In popular culture
 A riverside picnic scene in the James Bond film From Russia with Love was filmed near the village.
 The priory and parts of the village have been used as locations for the mystery series Midsomer Murders.
 The village is mentioned in the comic novel Three Men in a Boat by Jerome K. Jerome.
 The village is the setting for "The Invisible Millionaire", a short story in the Saint series by Leslie Charteris.
 The composer William Crotch was also an artist, and completed the drawing View from Hurley Bottom on 30 August 1806.

Public transport
The village is served by a bus route from Maidenhead. Closest railway stations are Marlow,  and Henley approximately four miles north east, south east and west respectively.

External links

Hurley Parish
Royal Berkshire History: Hurley

Notes

 
Villages in Berkshire
Civil parishes in Berkshire
Royal Borough of Windsor and Maidenhead
Populated places on the River Thames